Chems Dahmani (born 16 June 1986) is a French actor.

Filmography 
 2011: The Assault
 2010: From Paris with Love (film)
 2008: Des Poupées et Des Anges Directed by Nora Hamdi
 2008: Frontier(s) Directed by Xavier Gens
 2007: In The Ropes Directed by Magaly-Richard Serrano
 2001: Cinéma Permanent Directed by Charlotte Silvera

T.V 
 2008: Duval et Moretti "Compte à rebours" Directed by Dennis Berry
 2007: L'embrasement Directed by Philippe Triboit
 2006: Madame la Proviseure "Chacun Sa Chance" Directed by Philippe Berenger
 2005: Sabah Directed by Farid Lozès
 2004: L’évangile Selon Aimé Directed by André Chandelle
 2002: Brigade des Mineurs "Tacle Gagnant" Directed by Miguel Courtois
 2002: Jim la nuit Directed by Bruno Nuytten
 2001: Commissaire Moulin "Le Petit Bonhomme" Directed by Gérard Marx
 2000: Police District "Liaison Interdite" Directed by Jean Teddy Philippe
 2000: Le Combat de Julia Directed by Didier Bivel
 1999: Le Bahut "Le Testament d’un Professeur" Directed by Arnaud Selignac

External links 
 
 "Sabah" The Movie. Farid Lozès
 Profile from agent
 Pictures from Frontière(s) Xavier Gens

1986 births
Living people
French male film actors
French male television actors
Male actors from Paris
21st-century French male actors